Hydril is an unincorporated community in Kings County, California.

References

Unincorporated communities in California
Unincorporated communities in Kings County, California